The   is a body of water that comprises the southwestern tip of the Sea of Japan and borders the northern coasts of Fukuoka and Saga prefectures.

References 

Bodies of water of the Sea of Japan
Seas of Japan